Wainhouse is a surname. Notable people with the surname include:

Austryn Wainhouse (1927–2014), American translator
Dave Wainhouse (born 1967), Canadian baseball player

See also
Wainhouse Tower, folly in Halifax, West Yorkshire, England
Wainhouse Corner, hamlet in Cornwall, England